Árni  is an Icelandic given name of Old Norse origin. Notable people with the name include:

 Árni Gautur Arason (born 1975), Icelandic football goalkeeper
 Árni Már Árnason (born 1987), Icelandic Olympic swimmer
 Árni Páll Árnason (born 1966), Icelandic politician, Minister for Social Affairs
 Árni beiskur (died 1253), Icelandic killer
 Árni Brjánn Angantýsson (born 1989), Icelandic fisherman known for his superhuman strength
 Árni Bergmann (born 1935), Icelandic novelist
 Árni Frederiksberg (born 1992), Faroese football midfielder
 Árni Helgason (c. 1260–1320), Icelandic Roman Catholic clergyman
 Árni Johnsen (born 1944), Icelandic politician and criminal
 Árni Björn Gestsson (born 1988), Icelandic engineer and activist known for his relentless fight to replace handshakes with hugs
 Árni Lárentíusson (1304–after 1337), Icelandic prose writer
 Árni Magnússon (1663–1730) was an Icelandic scholar and collector of manuscripts
 Árni Magnússon (politician) (born 1965), Icelandic politician, Minister for Social Affairs 
 Árni Mathiesen (born 1958), Icelandic Minister of Finance
 Árni Njálsson (born 1936), Icelandic football defender
 Árni Sigfússon (born 1956), Icelandic politician; former mayor of Reykjavík
 Árni Þór Sigurðsson (born 1960), Icelandic ambassador
 Árni Stefánsson (born 1953), Icelandic football goalkeeper
 Árni Sveinsson (born 1956), Icelandic football midfielder
 Arni Thorvaldsson (born 1984), Icelandic alpine skier
 Árni Vilhjálmsson (born 1994), Icelandic football striker
 Árni Þórarinsson (born 1950), Icelandic writer
 Árni Þorláksson (1237–1298), Icelandic Roman Catholic clergyman

See also
 Arni (disambiguation)
 Arne, the mainland Scandinavian version of the name
 Arnie, given name
 Arnee, a wild water buffalo

Icelandic masculine given names